The Embassy of the Kingdom of Norway in Moscow is the chief diplomatic mission of Norway in the Russian Federation. It is located at 7 Povarskaya Street in the Arbat district of Moscow.

See also 

 Norway–Russia relations
 Diplomatic missions in Russia

References

External links 
  Embassy of Norway in Moscow

Norway–Russia relations
Norway
Moscow
Norway–Soviet Union relations
Arbat District
Cultural heritage monuments of regional significance in Moscow